Kakao is a South Korean internet company that was established in 2010. It formed as a result of a merger between Daum Communications and the original Kakao Inc. In 2014, the company was renamed Daum Kakao. The company rebranded once more in 2015, reverting simply to Kakao.

In May 2015, the company acquired Path, an American social media company that had become successful in Indonesia. In January 2016, Kakao acquired a 76.4% stake in LOEN Entertainment, a large South Korean entertainment company, for $1.5 billion. It was later rebranded as Kakao M. The company has gained further prominence from KakaoTalk, a free mobile instant messaging application for smartphones with text and call features. By May 2017, the app had 220 million registered users and 47 million active monthly users.

As of March 2022, the company is competing with Naver Corporation for No.1 position in the Japanese web comic and web novel market.

History

2006-2014: Founding of Kakao Corp.
Kakao Corp is the company behind KakaoTalk, which serves as its main platform and flagship application. It was founded in 2006 by Kim Bum-soo, the former CEO of NHN Corporation (the organization that emerged from the Hangame and Naver.com merger) as Kakao Inc. Kakao Corp. (then known as Kakao Inc.) is based in Seoul, South Korea. Manson Yeo and Sean Joh serve as the current co-CEOs.

In August 2013, three of globally ranked top 10 Android games (according to analytics provider App Annie) are tied into the KakaoTalk platform—Everybody’s Marble, Cookie Run, and Anipang. With 93 percent of South Korea's users on KakaoTalk, the free downloads of the games Ani Pang and Dragon Flight, which can only be played with a Kakao Talk account, were deemed "national" games. To maintain simplicity across all the provided services, Kakao applications can be purchased and logged in with links to KakaoTalk. Kakao Corp generated revenue of approximately $200M (USD) in 2013 through gaming, digital content, mobile commerce, and its marketing channels for brands and celebrities. Kakao Corp. was named a Top Developer on Google's Android Market, and KakaoTalk was chosen as the number one Free SMS App by Cnet.

According to a December 2013 App Annie report, Kakao is the world's third top publisher by monthly revenue at Google Play. Kakao Corp. is the number one publisher for iOS and Google Play in South Korea, and KakaoTalk is the number one app for iOS and Google Play revenue in South Korea. KakaoTalk was nominated for the Most Innovative Mobile App Award at the Global Mobile Awards 2014. Kakao Corp. agreed to buy Daum Communications Corp, to cut costs and save time to jump-start growth and gain a listing in Seoul, South Korea.

Kakao Corp's full suite of apps includes: KakaoTalk, KakaoStory, KakaoTaxi, KakaoAccount, KakaoMap, KakaoDriver, KakaoBus, KakaoMusic, KakaoGroup, KakaoHome, KakaoPlace, KakaoAlbum, KakaoPage, KakaoStyle, and KakaoAgit.

2014–2015: Merger of Daum and Kakao

On 26 May 2014, Kakao Corp. announced that it had decided to merge with Daum Communications, one of Korea's top Internet portals, through a stock swap. Once the two firms were combined the emergent company would have a  market capitalization, enabling it to lodge a credible threat to Naver, which is South Korea's biggest web portal.

In 2015, the company changed its name to Kakao, restoring its pre-merger name. Due to gambling and censorship issues within the Kakao ecosystem, the organization's board of directors ejected Kim-beom-soo as CEO and decided to replace him with Rim Ji-hoon. Kim Beom-soo become the largest shareholder in the new pro forma company with a 22.2 percent stake.

2015–present: New business model

Internet bank
Kakao was approved by South Korean regulators to become the nation's first internet-only bank in 2017. The internet bank engages in the same business as commercial banks, including processing deposits, loans and wiring money. Consumers will no longer need to visit a bank to open a new bank account or to get a loan. Kakao's business plan was considered innovative, and the company's business model was expected to secure sizable customer sign-ups relatively easily, based on the users of KakaoTalk, which is the country's most popular messaging application.

Although K Bank eventually became South Korea's first Internet-only bank having been launched several months prior, Kakao Bank immediately attracted more customers; 820,000 within four days of its launch on 27 July 2017. The dedicated Kakao Bank app itself was downloaded 1.5 million times within the same period. The bank had 3.5 million customers after a month. These figures trounced the 400,000 users that K-Bank amassed within 100 days of its existence.
By 26 September 2017, Kakao Bank lent ₩1.4 trillion ($1.2 billion), constituting 40 percent of the total loans in all of South Korea for that particular month. The bank's unprecedented expansion is seen as an exception to the closure of banks, particularly foreign-owned institutions. The fledgling performance for these banks is being blamed on the high cost of maintaining brick-and-mortar operations and the popularity of internet finance among Korean consumers.

Transportation services

On 10 March 2015, Daum Kakao launched their KakaoTaxi service that allows users to call a taxi using the KakaoTaxi application. About 600,000 taxi-consumers used the ride-hailing platform every day within eight months of its launch. 

In 2017, KakaoTaxi was renamed to Kakao T. The service includes the premium extension Kakao Taxi Black, which allows users to book rides in Seoul via the messenger app, exclusively carried in luxury cars such as Mercedes Benz, Lexus, and BMW. Fares for the premium service start at ₩8,000. Kakao announced plans to expand the offering to other Korean cities within the following year. Kakao announced in April 2019 that they would be launching a e-bike sharing service with an initial fleet of 400 bikes across two major cities.

2022 outage 
After a massive outage in October 2022, the co-chief executive, Namkoong Whon, resigned. A fire at an SK C&C data center in the south of Seoul caused a mass outage over the weekend and disrupted several of Kakao’s services, including messenger, ride-hailing, payment, banking and gaming.

Charity 
In March 2022, amid 2022 Russian invasion of Ukraine, Kakao donated approx. $3.65 million worth of Klay cryptocurrency to UNICEF to battle humanitarian crisis in Ukraine.

Services

Korea
Kakao provides a diverse set of services.

Community
 KakaoTalk: instant messaging and VoIP service
 KakaoStory: image, video, and music sharing service
 KakaoPage: web-based comic and novel service 
 Brunch: mobile contents publishing service

Entertainment
 KakaoMusic: music app with sharing features
 Melon: music streaming service acquired through Kakao M
 PotPlayer: media player for Windows

Fashion
 KakaoStyle: mobile fashion service.
KakaoHairshop: service, finding a nearby beauty salon

Finance
 KakaoPay: mobile e-wallet, integrated with KakaoTalk
 KakaoBank: mobile bank in Korea.
 Klaytn: consumer blockchain platform for mobile payments (via its subsidiary Ground X)

Investment
 Kakao INV: Investment in late stage startups.
 Kakao Ventures: Venture Capital for early stage startups.

Transportation
 Kakao T: transportation service app, providing taxi hailing, chauffeur service and navigation services.
 KakaoBus: real-time location and traffic information on buses.
 KakaoMetro: metro line app, allows users to view the metro map, plan trips, and check prices.

Video Games
 Kakao Games: video game subsidiary.

Others
 KakaoFriends: diverse products including finance, distribution, foods, and so on
 KakaoHello: Call app service based on Kakao account 
 KakaoTV: integrates Kakao TV Live broadcasting with KakaoTalk's open chatting
 KakaoHome: service, managing Smartphone home display 
 KakaoPlace: service, sharing famous places 
 KakaoAlbum: sharing pictures with Kakao friends
 Path: US social network service (discontinued)

Japan
Kakao Japan Corporation is the Japanese subsidiary of Kakao. It currently offers some of Kakao's Korean services as well as specific ones for the Japanese market. Kakao Japan has announced plans to launch a music service in a second attempt to penetrate the Japanese market. In April 2018, Kakao Japan announced plans to launch a video streaming service to compete against Netflix and Amazon with a similar pay model to their Piccoma service. The streaming service will be called Piccoma TV.

 KakaoTalk
 Kakao T
 Piccoma
 Piccoma TV

Controversy

KakaoTalk censorship

When the announcement by the Korean government that it would tighten its real-time monitoring to prevent people from spreading false information, the company cooperated fully by providing reams of conversation data. KakaoTalk users expressed their displeasure to the censorship saying that they would migrate to other messenger services. Because of this, as many as 1.5 million users are reported to have recently signed up for the mobile messenger service Telegram, which is known for its security.

Daum Kakao has explained the censorship, saying, "It is unthinkable not to follow the rules in a constitutional country." "The move (by Daum Kakao) reflects users' repulsion and fear against cyber censorship", said Yoo Ki-hong, a spokesman of the main opposition New Politics Alliance for Democracy. "The government should understand the sense of resistance of the people on the issue, rather than justifying its execution of warrants."

Kakao Corp. chairman accused of gambling
Kakao board chairman Kim Beom-soo was accused of gambling in Las Vegas in the early years of Kakao Corp from 2007 to 2010. Overseas gambling is illegal under Korean law. Korean prosecutors have reportedly obtained information from the U.S. Department of Justice and the Department of Treasury that Kakao mobile messenger founder Kim had spent 20 hours and 51 minutes at the Bellagio Hotel in Las Vegas in 2007 when he served as NHN Global CEO. He bet an average of $2,440 per session and lost $16,993, Korean Hankook Ilbo newspaper reported. The company decided to comply with the prosecution's warrants requesting monitoring of chatting records, a reversal from its earlier stance.

Notes

References

32. Naver vs. Kakao: Way of working with startups. https://pickool.net/naver-vs-kakao-way-of-working-with-startups/

External links

 
South Korean companies established in 2014
Companies based in Jeju City
Companies listed on KOSDAQ
South Korean brands
Internet properties established in 2014